Ligia Elena “Gigi” Moreira Burgos (born 19 March 1992) is an Ecuadorian professional footballer who plays as a defender for Spanish Primera Federación club Córdoba CF and captains the Ecuador women's national team.

International career
Moreira represented Ecuador at the 2008 South American U-17 Women's Championship.

Moreira captained Ecuador to the country's first ever FIFA Women's World Cup at the 2015 tournament edition in Canada.

At the 66th minute of Ecuador's opening match against Cameroon, with the score already 3–0 for Cameroon she was adjudged by referee Katalin Kulcsár to have fouled Cameroonian striker Gaëlle Enganamouit being the last defender and therefore was dismissed after received a red card. Ecuador eventually lost the match 6–0 with Gaëlle Enganamouit scoring three goals. Moreira was suspended from Ecuador's next match against Switzerland, returning in the third match against Japan.

International goals

References

External links
 Ligia Moreira at BDFútbol
 
 
 

1992 births
Living people
People from Buena Fe Canton
Ecuadorian women's footballers
Women's association football defenders
S.D. Quito footballers
L.D.U. Quito Femenino players
Patriotas Boyacá footballers
C.D. Universidad Católica del Ecuador footballers
São José Esporte Clube (women) players
Real Oviedo (women) players
CDE Racing Féminas players
Primera Federación (women) players
Campeonato Brasileiro de Futebol Feminino Série A1 players
Segunda Federación (women) players
Ecuador women's international footballers
2015 FIFA Women's World Cup players
Pan American Games competitors for Ecuador
Footballers at the 2015 Pan American Games
Ecuadorian expatriate footballers
Ecuadorian expatriate sportspeople in Colombia
Expatriate women's footballers in Colombia
Ecuadorian expatriate sportspeople in Brazil
Expatriate women's footballers in Brazil
Ecuadorian expatriate sportspeople in Spain
Expatriate women's footballers in Spain
21st-century Ecuadorian women